HV 888, also known as WOH S140, is a red supergiant (RSG) star located in the Large Magellanic Cloud. The effective temperature is estimated to be around 3,500 K. If placed at the center of the Solar System, its photosphere would engulf the orbit of Jupiter and possibly even Saturn.

The apparent magnitude of HV 888 is variable, with an amplitude of 0.59 magnitudes around a mean value of about 11.57.  It is classified as a semiregular variable of type SRc indicating a cool supergiant.  Variations in its radial velocity have led to the suggestion that it is a binary.

See also 
 WOH G64
 Stephenson 2 DFK 1

References 

Dorado (constellation)
M-type supergiants
Semiregular variable stars
J05041413-6716143
IRAS catalogue objects
Extragalactic stars
Large Magellanic Cloud
TIC objects